Simon William Gamble (born 5 March 1968) is an English former footballer who scored 15 goals from 64 appearances in the Football League playing as a forward for Lincoln City. He also played non-league football for Grantham Town, Boston United, Shepshed Albion, Harworth Colliery Institute, Brigg Town, Armthorpe Welfare, Glapwell, Collingham (Notts) and Retford United. In 2020, he was assistant manager of Retford.

References

1968 births
Living people
People from Bassetlaw District
Footballers from Nottinghamshire
English footballers
Association football forwards
Lincoln City F.C. players
Grantham Town F.C. players
Boston United F.C. players
Shepshed Dynamo F.C. players
Harworth Colliery F.C. players
Brigg Town F.C. players
Armthorpe Welfare F.C. players
Glapwell F.C. players
Collingham F.C. (Nottinghamshire) players
Retford United F.C. players
English Football League players
Southern Football League players
National League (English football) players